The Rindos affair was an academic scandal that occurred at the University of Western Australia.

Background
In early 1989, David Rindos, an archaeologist by qualification, was hired to fill a vacancy in the university's Department of Archaeology. Rindos commenced work on 13 June 1989. In 1990, the head of department, Dr Sandra Bowdler, took study leave. Bowdler was the Foundation Professor of Archaeology. Rindos became acting head of department in her place.

Rindos later said that during his time as acting head, he was made aware of problems in the department, including favouritism and affairs between students and staff members. In December 1990, Rindos wrote a memo to Professor Charles Oxnard, then-head of Agriculture and Science, detailing the allegations of academic misconduct against Bowdler.

In June 1992, Rindos' three-year probation period was complete and a decision on tenure was due. In May, the Vice-Chancellor, Fay Gale, had extended the review period by six months after having received a memo from Dr Michael Partis, the new head of department. A Tenure Review Committee was formed as a result. After an hour of deliberation, the committee unanimously decided to deny tenure.

In July 1992 the Department of Archaeology was dissolved.

On 10 June 1993, Rindos was dismissed, effective 13 June.

In early 1996, the university's Senate announced an inquiry into the denial of tenure to Rindos. The terms of reference of the inquiry did not extend to investigating the allegations of misconduct against Bowdler.

The Western Australian Legislative Council investigated the denial of tenure to Rindos. Their report was delivered in December 1997.

David Rindos died in 1996.

See also
 Rindos v Hardwick

References

External links
 Times Higher Education Supplement: Sacked lecturer wins inquiry
 the "Rindos / UWA Case" Site
 Brian Martin: "David Rindos versus the University of Western Australia: analogies to the Orr case" (Chapter 6 of The Subversion of Australian Universities, edited by John Biggs and Richard Davis, Wollongong: Fund for Intellectual Dissent, 2002, pp. 93–108.)
 Philippa Martyr: "Unworthy of strong women" (Chapter 8 of The Subversion of Australian Universities, edited by John Biggs and Richard Davis, Wollongong: Fund for Intellectual Dissent, 2002, pp. 118–126.)

Further reading
 

Academic scandals
University of Western Australia
1980s in Perth, Western Australia
1990s in Perth, Western Australia